Operafjellet ("The Opera Mountain") is a mountain on Spitsbergen in Svalbard, Norway. It is named for the amphitheatre-shape of the mountain on the western side, with the peak Tenoren ("The Tenor") sticking up. On 29 August 1996, it was the site for the crash of Vnukovo Airlines Flight 2801 during approach to Svalbard Airport, Longyear, killing 141 people.

References

Mountains of Spitsbergen